Talia Gibson (born 18 June 2004) is an Australian tennis player.

Gibson has a career-high singles ranking by the WTA of world No. 340 achieved on 26 December 2022, and a career-high WTA doubles ranking of world No. 226, achieved on 16 January 2023.

Gibson won her first major ITF Circuit title at the 2022 Playford International, in the doubles draw, partnering Alexandra Bozovic.

She made her Grand Slam debut at the 2023 Australian Open as a wildcard in singles and doubles.

Grand Slam performance timeline

Singles

Doubles

Career finals

Singles: 5 (3 titles, 2 runner-ups)

Doubles: 4 (4 titles)

References

External links

2004 births
Living people
Australian female tennis players
Tennis players from Perth, Western Australia
21st-century Australian women